John T. Smith may refer to:

 J.T. Smith (wrestler) (born 1967), American retired professional wrestler
 John T. Smith (congressman) (1801–1864), U.S. Representative from Pennsylvania
 John T. Smith (blues musician) (1896–1940), Texas blues musician

See also 
 John Smith (disambiguation)